Leif Roland Freij (29 March 1943 – 17 June 1998) was a Swedish Greco-Roman wrestler who won silver medals at the world and European championships in 1966. He finished 16th at the 1960 Summer Olympics and fourth at the 1965 World Championship. His uncle Gustav Freij also competed in Greco-Roman wrestling at the 1960 Olympics.

References

External links
 

1943 births
1998 deaths
Olympic wrestlers of Sweden
Wrestlers at the 1960 Summer Olympics
Swedish male sport wrestlers
World Wrestling Championships medalists
Sportspeople from Malmö
20th-century Swedish people